Trichilia solitudinis is a species of plant in the family Meliaceae. The plant is native to the Amazon region, in Pará and Roraima states of northern Brazil, and adjacent Peru. It is threatened by habitat loss.

References

solitudinis
Flora of the Amazon
Flora of Brazil
Flora of Peru
Flora of Pará
Flora of Roraima
Vulnerable flora of South America
Taxonomy articles created by Polbot